Paul Cristian Hodea (born 29 June 1998) is a Romanian professional footballer who plays as a midfielder. Hodea made his Liga I debut on 29 June 2016 for Universitatea Craiova in a 2-0 win against Petrolul Ploiești.

References

External links
 

1998 births
Living people
Sportspeople from Râmnicu Vâlcea
Romanian footballers
Association football midfielders
Liga I players
CS Universitatea Craiova players
Liga II players
FC Hermannstadt players
CSC 1599 Șelimbăr players